Mycotrupes retusus is a species in the family Geotrupidae ("earth-boring scarab beetles"), in the order Coleoptera ("beetles"). The species is known generally as the "sandhills earth boring scarab beetle".
It is found in North America.

References

Further reading
 Arnett, R. H. Jr., M. C. Thomas, P. E. Skelley and J. H. Frank. (eds.). (21 June 2002). American Beetles, Volume II: Polyphaga: Scarabaeoidea through Curculionoidea. CRC Press LLC, Boca Raton, Florida .
 Richard E. White. (1983). Peterson Field Guides: Beetles. Houghton Mifflin Company.
 Ross H. Arnett. (2000). American Insects: A Handbook of the Insects of America North of Mexico. CRC Press.

Geotrupidae
Beetles described in 1866